Julião dos Reis Mendonça (born 2 July 1998), commonly known as Julião, is an East Timorese international footballer who plays as a defender for Liga Futebol Amadora side Boavista.

Career statistics

International

References

1998 births
Living people
East Timorese footballers
Timor-Leste international footballers
Association football defenders
Footballers at the 2018 Asian Games
Asian Games competitors for East Timor
Competitors at the 2019 Southeast Asian Games
Southeast Asian Games competitors for East Timor